Pipitea can mean:

Pipitea, New Zealand, a suburb of Wellington, New Zealand
Pipitea Marae, a meeting ground in Pipitea, Wellington, New Zealand
Pipitea Point railway station, a railway station in Pipitea, Wellington, New Zealand
Pipitea Point Railway Workshops, Wellington's first railway workshops
Pipitea (planet), a planet in the Tucana constellation